Peninsula was an Otago electorate in the New Zealand Parliament from 1881 to 1893, based on the Otago Peninsula.

Population centres
The previous electoral redistribution was undertaken in 1875 for the 1875–1876 election. In the six years since, New Zealand's European population had increased by 65%. In the 1881 electoral redistribution, the House of Representatives increased the number of European representatives to 91 (up from 84 since the 1875–76 election). The number of Māori electorates was held at four. The House further decided that electorates should not have more than one representative, which led to 35 new electorates being formed, including Peninsula, and two electorates that had previously been abolished to be recreated. This necessitated a major disruption to existing boundaries.

History
It was represented by three Members of Parliament.

The first election was contested by James Seaton, William Cutten, Michael Donnelly, and James Lewis. They received 296, 284, 203 and 54 votes, respectively. Seaton had previously represented  in the 6th Parliament, whilst Cutten was a member of the  1st Parliament and had represented  in 1878–1879. Seaton died on 18 November 1882 in an accident, which caused a by-election.

The by-election was held on 22 January   and contested by William Larnach, Bishop Moran, and Michael Donnelly. At the nomination meeting, Bishop Moran received the highest number of votes, but at the election, he came a distant last. Larnach, Donnelly, and Moran received 667, 182, and 138 votes, respectively.

The  was contested by Larnach, Owen James Hodge, and John Wells. They received 658, 352 and 14 votes, respectively. Larnach obtained 627 votes versus 457 for Begg.

The election was won by Earnshaw, who received 780 votes versus 660 for Larnach. Earnshaw represent the Peninsula electorate until the end of the parliamentary term in 1893, when the electorate was abolished.

Members of Parliament
Key

Election results

1890 election

Notes

References

Historical electorates of New Zealand
1881 establishments in New Zealand
1893 disestablishments in New Zealand
Politics of Otago